The Columbus Jackaroos are an Australian Rules football team based in the city of Columbus, Ohio. The team is a part of the wider Columbus ARFC Inc. organization which is a nationally recognized nonprofit organization.  The Jackaroos compete in the United States Australian Football League and were Division Two national champions in 2013 and Division Three runner-up in 2012.

History

Australian Rules Football in the United States began in 1997 as the Cincinnati Dockers tackled the Louisville Kings. These clubs would form the foundation of the USAFL. In the mid-2000s, young, athletic Dockers full back Matthew Reiss moved to central Ohio. In 2007, Chester Ridenour returned from a trip to Australia with a new-found enthusiasm for Aussie Rules. He subsequently joined the Dockers, who had never seen such a tall, determined player. Somewhere in between his first game and July 2008, Ridenour tricked Reiss into founding a club in their native city.  They were a match made in heaven: Ridenour's oft obnoxious enthusiasm and energy meshed well with Reiss's pragmatic sensibilities.

Recruitment was easy for the newly formed club, as Ridenour initially tapped into his vast sporting network associated with Thomas Worthington High School. The club won its first meeting with the Cincinnati Dockers in 2008 and several players competed on their national championship team that season. The team grew through 2009 and 2010, with the Jackaroos obtaining their first win at the USAFL national championships over the Las Vegas Gamblers in 2010.

Former Marine John Fisher took over the coaching reins in 2011.  Fisher's style of play, emphasizing hard running and handball, paid dividends.  In 2011, the Jackaroos dismantled the Nashville Kangaroos and the North Carolina Tigers but key players missing at Nationals in Austin, Texas, meant the team went winless.  The following season, Columbus enjoyed its first ever win over the Chicago Swans and performed consistently all year.  The 2012 national championships saw the Jackaroos lose to Chicago in highly controversial circumstances in the Division Three grand final.

This miscarriage of justice only served to steel the resolve of the playing group and 2013 led to by far the greatest season in central Ohio's Aussie Rules history. The Jackaroos had only dropped one game heading in to Nationals in Austin; this form raised them into Division Two. The Jackaroos vanquished Baltimore/Washington, Minnesota and New York in short order. The grand final against Los Angeles saw a healthy crowd watch David slay Goliath, as the Jackaroos raised the championship cup for the first time. Many have said it was the greatest victory in Aussie Rules Football history.

See also

References

External links
 

Australian rules football clubs in the United States
Australian rules football clubs established in 2008
2008 establishments in Ohio
Sports teams in Ohio
Sports teams in Columbus, Ohio